ATN Aastha is a Canadian pay television channel owned by Asian Television Network (ATN).

ATN Aastha broadcasts religious and spiritual programming in Hindi, Gujarati, and English, focusing mainly on the teachings and principles of Hinduism. Programming includes discourses, devotional music, meditation and yoga techniques, coverage of religious festivals, and ancient Indian scientific practices such as ayurveda. Programming is primarily sourced from Aastha International, an Indian-based television channel, in addition to Canadian content.

History
In April 2005, ATN was granted approval from the Canadian Radio-television and Telecommunications Commission (CRTC) to launch a television channel called ATN - South Asian Devotional Music & Discourse Channel, described as "a national ethnic Category 2 pay television programming undertaking devoted to religious programming presented in South Asian languages."

The channel launched on October 19, 2005 as ATN Aastha.

On September 13, 2012, the CRTC approved Asian Television Network's request to convert ATN Aastha from a licensed Category B specialty service to an exempted Cat. B third language service.

References

External links
 

Religious television networks in Canada
Television channels and stations established in 2005
Digital cable television networks in Canada
Mass media of Indian diaspora
Hindi-language television in Canada
South Asian television in Canada